Gudger is a surname. Notable people with the surname include:

 Eleanor Gudger, English poker player
 Garlan Gudger, American politician
 James M. Gudger Jr. (1855–1920), American politician
 V. Lamar Gudger (1919–2004), American politician